The National Defense Corps Incident (Hanja: 國民防衛軍事件) was a death march that occurred in the winter of 1951 during the Korean War.

On 11 December 1950, South Korea issued an act establishing the National Defense Corps. South Korean citizens aged 17 to 40, excluding military, police and government officials, were drafted into the National Defense Corps. The Syngman Rhee government adopted officers from Great Korean Young Adults Association (대한청년단; 大韓靑年團), which was a pro-Rhee Syngman group, into the Corps.

Immediately, 406,000 drafted citizens were deployed in 49 training units, then National Defense Corps soldiers were ordered to march southward on the Korean peninsula under the Chinese offensive. However, funds for food purchases were embezzled by the National Defense Corps Commander Kim Yun-geun (김윤근 金潤根; also spelled Kim Yoon-keun or Kim Yungun), son-in-law of Defence minister Shin Sung-mo. Approximately 300,000 men were lost to death or desertion during the three-week, 300-mile "death march". By June 1951, when an investigating committee made known its findings, it was reported that some 50,000 to 90,000 soldiers starved to death or died of disease on the march and in the training camps.

On 30 April 1951, the National Assembly of South Korea adopted a resolution on disbandment of the National Defense Corps. The National Assembly investigation showed that the commanding officers embezzled one billion won, and tens of millions of won was misappropriated to President Syngman Rhee's political fund. 

In May 1951, vice-president Yi Si-yeong resigned. In June, it was reported that five billion won in funds for the National Defense Corps had been embezzled. On 12 August 1951, five commanding officers were executed as persons in charge of the incident.

See also
December Massacres of 1950 in the Korean War
Truth and Reconciliation Commission (South Korea)

References

War crimes in South Korea
South Korean war crimes
Military scandals
Korean War crimes
Political scandals
Forced marches
1951 in South Korea